This is a list of rugby league competitions in Australia with their respective premiers. This list contains only the first-grade tier for professional competitions as well as country and statewide semi-professional youth competitions.

Domestic

National

Men's Competitions

New South Wales 

 Merger of Group 1 Rugby League and Group 18 Rugby League(1914-05) which both field junior competitions.
 Formed as Group 18 in 1946 but when the boundaries were re-drawn in 1966 to include three new clubs the group's name was changed to Group 3.
 Group 5 was the local competition from 1961 until it merged with another local competition to form Group 19 in 1980.
 This competition was formed by Group 8 and Group 19 which were formed in 1932 and 1946 respectively.
 Formed as Berrima District Rugby League and changed its name to Group 6 in 1946.
 Formed as South Coast Rugby League and changed its name to Group 7 in 1955.
 Formed in 1947 as a junior competition for Newcastle club, Lakes United. It was upgraded to full CRL membership as Group 12 in 1967 then renamed in 1981.

Queensland

Other States

Youth 

1 2017 Holden Cup Finals Result.

2 2016 Under 16 National Finals Result.

3 2016 Cyril Connell Finals Result.

Women's Competitions

New South Wales & Queensland

Other States

See also 

 Rugby league in Australia
 Australian Rugby League Commission
 List of Australian rugby league clubs
 List of Australian rugby league stadiums by capacity
 List of results of the Australian Kangaroos
 Sport in Australia

References 

Rugby league in Australia
 
Rugby league competitions in Australia